The Absence is a 1992 French-German-Spanish drama film directed by Peter Handke. It follows the journey of four nameless people: the old man, the woman, the soldier, and the gambler. The film is based on Handke's novella with the same name. It premiered in competition at the 49th Venice International Film Festival.

Cast
 Bruno Ganz as the gambler
 Jeanne Moreau as the writer's wife
 Alex Descas as the soldier
 Eustaquio Barjau as the writer
 Sophie Semin as the young woman
 Arielle Dombasle

Release
The film premiered on 6 September 1992 in competition at the 49th Venice International Film Festival. It was released in France on 20 January 1993 and Germany on 24 February 1994.

Reception
Thomas Quinn Curtiss wrote in The New York Times: "The movie, being shown at the film festival here, follows four people - an old man, a young woman, a soldier and a player - as they walk about an imaginary topography across continents, hoping to escape from their everyday existence. ... They pontificate and recite monologues, but as they arrive at no conclusions the spectator may wonder whether their journey was really necessary."

References

External links

1992 films
Films based on works by Peter Handke
Films directed by Peter Handke
French drama films
1990s French-language films
German drama films
1990s German-language films
Films with screenplays by Peter Handke
Spanish drama films
1990s Spanish-language films
1992 drama films
1992 multilingual films
French multilingual films
German multilingual films
Spanish multilingual films
Spanish-language French films
1990s French films
1990s German films
French-language Spanish films